Makkada is a village in Kakkodi panchayath in Calicut district of Kerala state. Geographically Makkada covers about half the size of the kakkodi Panchayath and situates north of the Panchayath. Unlike many other villages in Kerala there isn't a town called Makkada in this village, but there are a couple of institutions which carry the name, the post office and an LP school.

References

Villages in Kozhikode district
Kozhikode north